Wildflower is a 1991 television film directed by Diane Keaton and starring Beau Bridges, Susan Blakely, Patricia Arquette, William McNamara and Reese Witherspoon. It is based on Sara Flanigan's book Alice.

Plot
In a small town in 1938, adolescent Sammy Perkins (William McNamara) and his sibling Ellie (Reese Witherspoon) find Alice (Patricia Arquette) alone in a shack, where her heartless stepdad forces her to live because he is disgusted by her disabilities. Sammy and Ellie quickly grow close to Alice, who struggles with both epilepsy and a hearing problem. Together, the brother and sister help their friend live a more fulfilling life, but the process is interrupted by Alice's stepfather.

Cast
Beau Bridges as Jack Perkins
Susan Blakely as Ada Guthrie
William McNamara as Sammy Perkins
Reese Witherspoon as Ellie Perkins
Patricia Arquette as Alice Guthrie
Bessie Morgan as Collin Wilcox

References

External links

1991 films
1991 television films
1991 romantic drama films
American romantic drama films
American drama television films
1990s English-language films
Films based on American novels
Films directed by Diane Keaton
Romance television films
1990s American films